Wrasses are a family, Labridae, of brightly coloured marine fish.

Wrasse may also refer to:

 Wrasse Records, a British record label
 Wrasse blenny, Hemiemblemaria simulus, a species of fish